Carien Kleibeuker (born 12 March 1978) is a Dutch former speed skater who is specialised in the long distances, 3000 and mainly 5000 metres. She is the current holder of the Dutch record on the 10,000 metres distances, as well as the current holder of the unofficial world one-hour record, with 40,569.56 metres skated.

Speed skating
During the Dutch Single Distance Championships Kleibeuker won her first medal at a highly rated tournament as she finished in third position at the 5000 metres. In the following years she participated, but never managed to equal or improve her effort from 2000, until December 2005, when she won the 5000 metres race in the B Division at a World Cup meeting. This effort secured her a nomination for the 2006 Winter Olympics held in Turin. A top-3 ranking at the 2005 Dutch Single Distance Championships would definitely qualify her for the Olympics. She let no hesitation and won the distance with big names as Renate Groenewold, Gretha Smit and Moniek Kleinsman behind her. At the 2006 Winter Olympics Kleibeuker would finish in 10th position in the women's 5000 metres.

Besides long track speed skating, Kleibeuker also is a marathon speed skater. As of the 2007–08 season she will only focus on marathon skating, dropping her long track appearances.

Bribery witness

At the 2006 Turin Olympics, Kleibeuker witnessed a bribery attempt by two members of the Dutch speed skating team. In 2009, she was called in as a witness by the Netherlands Olympic Committee and Sports Federation, which found that coach Ingrid Paul had offered Polish speed-skater Katarzyna Bachleda-Curuś money to forfeit the race. If she had withdrawn, it would have allowed Gretha Smit, who was eliminated, to be reinstated. Bachleda-Curuś refused.

Records

Personal records

World records

Tournament overview

Source:

References

External links

Carien Kleibeuker 

1978 births
Dutch female speed skaters
Speed skaters at the 2006 Winter Olympics
Speed skaters at the 2014 Winter Olympics
Olympic speed skaters of the Netherlands
Medalists at the 2014 Winter Olympics
Olympic medalists in speed skating
Olympic bronze medalists for the Netherlands
Sportspeople from Heerenveen
Living people
World Single Distances Speed Skating Championships medalists
21st-century Dutch women
20th-century Dutch women